The second season of Kud puklo da puklo premiered on 7 September 2015 and ended on 9 June 2016.

Description
This season contains 179 episodes and Jelena Perčin, Vladimir Posavec Tušek, Katja Rožmarić, Monika Mihajlović and Petar Burić joined the cast. At the end of episode 107 Jelena Perčin, Vladimir Posavec Tušek, Jagoda Kumrić and Katja Rožmarić departed the cast. At the beginning of episode 108 Tomislav Krstanović joined the cast.

Cast

Main 
 Mirna Medaković Stepinac as Katarina Gavran
 Momčilo Otašević as Damir Gavran
 Milan Štrljić as Mile Gavran
 Miodrag Krivokapić as Stipe Žilj
Tijana Pečenčić as Diana Tepavac
Asim Ugljen as Josip Tepavac
 Ecija Ojdanić as Barbara Murgić
Žarko Radić as Sveto Tepavac
Barbara Vicković as Ane Jelaska
 Suzana Nikolić as Zdenka Gavran
Jelena Perčin as Miranda Žeravica (Episodes 1-107)
Vladimir Posavec Tušek as Dario Žeravica (Episodes 1-107)
Jagoda Kumrić as Snježana Mamić (Episodes 6-107)
 Janko Popović Volarić as Krešimir Kolarić (Episodes 6-179)
Miran Kurspahić as Tomislav Mamić (Episodes 6-179)
Katja Rožmarić as Sara Žeravica (Episodes 1-107)
Monika Mihajlović as Tina Božić
 Željko Pervan as Marko Došen
 Sanja Vejnović as Milica Mamić
Petar Burić as Mate Božić
 Vesna Tominac Matačić as Višnja Došen
Tomislav Krstanović as don Frajno Olić (Episodes 108-179)

Recurring 

 Janko Popović Volarić as Krešimir Kolarić (Episode 5)
Tomislav Krstanović as don Frajno Olić (Episodes 92-105, 107)

Episodes

Croatian comedy television series
2015 Croatian television seasons
2016 Croatian television seasons